Carolyn Beebe (September 30, 1873 – September 24, 1950) was an American pianist, founder of the New York Chamber Music Society in 1915.

Early life 
Carolyn Harding Beebe was born in Westfield, New Jersey, the daughter of Silas Edwin Beebe and Helen Louise Tift Beebe. She was a piano student of musician Joseph Mosenthal, and from 1903 to 1905 studied in Europe with German composer Moritz Moszkowski.

Career 
Beebe performed as a pianist in Berlin, Paris, and Hamburg as a young woman, and had a busy schedule of appearances in the United States. She taught on the faculty of Frank Damrosch's Institute of Musical Art. She played recital in a duo with Belgian violinist Édouard Dethier, and chamber music with the Kneisel Quartet and other groups. She also performed at a White House party for President Woodrow Wilson, and made piano roll recordings of several works.

Beebe was founder (with Gustave Langenus) and director of the New York Chamber Music Society. She was the only woman musician to play at the Society's first concert, at Aeolian Hall in December 1915, and still the only woman in the group's eleven-member roster in 1917 and in 1922. The Society gave first performances of dozens of new compositions, featuring works by Deems Taylor, Samuel Coleridge-Taylor, Henry Holden Huss, and Ethel Leginska.

In 1919, she founded her own teaching studio near Carnegie Hall. Beebe declared radio "valuable to art" in a 1922 interview. "The radio audience in no different than the concert, opera, or vaudeville audience. It is composed of the same people, and whatever pleases them outside their homes will please them within their homes."

She served on the board of the National Orchestral Association from 1930, and on the board of the National Association of American Composers and Conductors from 1933. She received a medal from the National Federation of Music Clubs in 1945.

In 1926, the National Federation of Music Clubs began offering a prize named for Carolyn Beebe, for chamber music compositions.

Personal life 
Carolyn Beebe married a medical doctor, Henry Howard Whitehouse, in 1932. Whitehouse died in 1938. Carolyn Beebe Whitehouse died in 1950, aged 76 years, in Mystic, Connecticut.

References

External links 
 A photograph of Carolyn Beebe at the piano, from the Philip Hale Photograph Collection, Boston Public Library.

1873 births
1950 deaths
American women classical pianists
American classical pianists
People from Westfield, New Jersey